Peter Wallace Forbes (November 23, 1850 – March 1, 1923) served in the California State Assembly for the 27th district from 1907 to 1909. He was born November 23, 1850, in Prince Edward Island, Canada.

References

People from Prince Edward Island
Democratic Party members of the California State Assembly
1850 births
1923 deaths